Margaret, Countess of Devon may refer to:
 Margaret de Bohun, 2nd Countess of Devon (1311 — 1391)
 Margaret Beaufort, Countess of Devon (1409 — 1449)